Michael Kielsky is an American attorney, perennial candidate, and the former Chairman of the Libertarian Party of Arizona. Kielsky, a Phoenix attorney, challenged the results of Arizona's controversial 2016 presidential primary. Kielsky is a leading defense attorney in cases involving photo radar.

Election history
 2014 Libertarian candidate for Legislative District 25 losing to Justin Olson and Russell Bowers.
 2012 Libertarian candidate for Maricopa County Attorney receiving 27.5% of the vote and losing to Bill Montgomery.
 2010 Libertarian candidate for the Special Election for Maricopa County Attorney, receiving 25.9% of the vote and losing to Bill Montgomery.
 2008 Libertarian candidate for Maricopa County Attorney, losing to Andrew Thomas.
 2004 Libertarian candidate for Arizona's 5th Congressional District losing to J. D. Hayworth. Kielsky received 6,189 votes.

References

External links
 Biography
 Campaign website
 Libertarian Officer website

Living people
Arizona Libertarians
State political party chairs of Arizona
Grand Canyon University alumni
1946 births